The Grand Arcade is a shopping centre in the town centre of Wigan, England. Built in 2007, it consists of 39 retailers with a total annual footfall of 6.3 million people. The centre is owned and operated by RDI REIT, a property investment business. When built it was the UK's first carbon neutral shopping centre, and so produces net zero carbon dioxide emissions. The Grand Arcade houses a bronze statue of George Formby designed by Manx artist Amanda Barton, which was unveiled in 2007.

History

The construction of the mall started in 2005 at a cost of £120 million. It was built on the former site of The Ritz, an Art Moderne cinema open from 1968-1997, Wigan Central railway station and Wigan Casino, a nightclub which operated between 1973 and 1981 and was known widely for its northern soul music. An exhibition space in the Grand Arcade holds some memorabilia and photographs of the Casino. Before construction began on the site, evidence was found by Oxford Archaeology North that it was a significant Roman site in Wigan during the late first and second centuries AD. These excavations revealed numerous artefacts, including a hearth, pottery pieces, and tiles. One significant discovery was a hypocaust, which was used as a heating system in a  Roman bathhouse. The hypocaust was restored and relocated to Concert Square, a communal area within Grand Arcade. 

After the financial crisis of 2007–2008 Modus, the original developer of the Grand Arcade, shelved plans for a mixed-use  apartment block called Tower Grand which would have been built on the site adjoining the centre.  As of 2020, the land for the planned apartment block remains unused and empty. The proposals were later scrapped after Modus went into administration in 2009.

Retail

The centre has several high street brands such as Boots, Waterstones and H & M. It also holds The Casino Café which is themed on the historical Wigan Casino Social Club. In 2015 Clarks and New Look relocated their stores in Wigan to The Grand Arcade from The Galleries where they were previously based. All of the original four anchor stores have closed. BHS in 2016, when it went into administration, and TK Maxx in 2017 relocating to  Robin Retail Park. Marks & Spencer has also relocated to the nearby retail park. In January 2021, the closure of all Debenhams stores in the UK was announced, effectively leaving the Grand Arcade without any anchor stores for the first time since its opening in 2007.

Transport
The shopping centre is bounded by Standishgate, Crompton Street, Millgate and Riverway. Some shops have two entrances - one to the internal mall and one onto the high street. It has two multi-storey carparks on Milgate and Crompton Street with over 850 spaces combined. Bus access is available at the nearby Wigan bus station. Two railway stations serve Wigan town centre, Wigan Wallgate and Wigan North Western.

References

External links
The Grand Arcade website

 Shopping centres in Greater Manchester
Buildings and structures in Wigan